Stenolechia is a genus of moths in the family Gelechiidae.

Species
Stenolechia celeris (Omelko, 1988)
Stenolechia deltocausta Meyrick, 1929
Stenolechia frustulenta Meyrick, 1923
Stenolechia gemmella (Linnaeus, 1758)
Stenolechia marginipunctella (Stainton, 1859)
Stenolechia orsicoma (Meyrick, 1918)
Stenolechia trichaspis (Meyrick, 1918)
Stenolechia zelosaris Meyrick, 1923
notomochla species-group
Stenolechia notomochla Meyrick, 1935
Stenolechia robusta Kanazawa, 1984
bathrodyas species-group
Stenolechia bathrodyas Meyrick, 1935
Stenolechia kodamai Okada, 1962
rectivalva species-group
Stenolechia squamifera Kanazawa, 1984
Stenolechia rectivalva Kanazawa, 1984

References

 
Litini
Moth genera